The Estonia women's national under-16 basketball team is a national basketball team of Estonia, administered by the Estonian Basketball Association. It represents the country in women's international under-16 basketball competitions.

FIBA U16 Women's European Championship participations

See also
Estonia women's national basketball team
Estonia women's national under-18 basketball team
Estonia men's national under-16 basketball team

References

External links
Archived records of Estonia team participations

Basketball in Estonia
Basketball
Women's national under-16 basketball teams